Shopner Thikana (Translation: The Address of the Dream) is a Bangladeshi feature film released on 11 May 1995 directed by M. A. Khaleq. This romantic drama film was released on Eid vacation and was a huge success throughout Bangladesh.

Plot
The rich Sumon and poor Sumi Chowdhury are two class friends from childhood, and immediately fall in love. Farha, his other childhood friend and the only daughter of his father's affluent friend and co-partner also loves Sumon but Sumon thinks of her as just a friend. Sumon's parents and Farha's father fix their marriage which excites her more. Sumon immediately rejects it because he loves Sumi. When he tells Farha this, she becomes very heartbroken and jealous and vows to break them up. However, this further complicates the love triangle to the point that Sumon loses his memory in an accident by Farha's father's goons. Sumon's mother then dies of shock because of his memory loss. On their wedding day, Farha commits suicide in front of him, Sumi and her father because she regrets trapping Sumon in their fake love marriage and losing him as a result.

Cast 
 Salman Shah as Sumon
 Shabnur as Sumi Chowdhury
 Sonia as Farha
 Rajib as Farha's father
 Abul Hayat as Sumon's father
 Dolly Johur as Sumi's mother
 Prabir Mitra as Sumi's father
 Dildar as Fazil Ali
 Black Anwar
 Syed Akhter Ali

Soundtrack
The music of this film was directed by Alam Khan and lyrics were penned by Moniruzzaman Monir.

Release
Shopner Thikana was released on 11 May 1995 on Eid vacation.

References

External links
 

1995 films
Bengali-language Bangladeshi films
Bangladeshi drama films
Films scored by Alam Khan
1990s Bengali-language films
1995 drama films